Brahim Attaeb better known by his stage name and mononym Brahim (born in Torhout, Belgium on 24 February 1984), is a Belgian R&B singer and presenter of Moroccan descent.

Music career
Brahim became famous when he participated in Belgian first inaugural season of the Idool series, the Belgian Flanders version of the Idol series. He finished fourth overall. Despite this loss, he still got a record deal as his song "Turn the Music Up" hit the top of the Ultratop 50 Flanders Singles Chart, and the follow-up "I Wanna Be" also reached #8.

He gained fame in Morocco through a cover of "Didi", an English language remake of Cheb Khaled's song. The single was successful in Belgium reaching #10 on Ultratop 50 charts. A French language added rap segment featured Nessa.

Eurosong / Eurovision
Brahim has tried twice to represent Belgium in Eurovision Song Contest. In 2006, he took part in Eurosong '06, the Belgian selection process for Eurovision, singing "P.O.W.E.R.", in a bid to represent Belgium in the competition. Passing the semi-finals he earned a wildcard to the finals, but finished only fourth.

In 2008, he tried yet again for Eurovision by taking part in  Eurosong '08 with "What I Like About You". Coming second in the initial round, he reached the finals finishing fourth overall.

Radio and television career
Brahim has also been a successful radio and television personality. In March 2011, he started the programme I-CLiPS as presenter. The show was on VRT children channel Ketnet. He also presented the 2-hour radio show MNM Dance 50 VRT radio station known as MNM. In 2012, he returned to Ketnet with I-fan.

He also spearheaded an anti-bullying campaign with the song "Move" in collaboration with Charlotte Leysen. It was picked as "Radio 2 Zomerhit 2012" (Radio 2's Summer Hit of 2012) for the "Best children pop category.

In late 2012, he stopped presenting MNM Dance 50, but coming back with a similar format show called Urban 50 again on MNM radio station.

Host of In de mix
In 2012, Brahim became host of In de mix, a popular television program bringing in artist from pop and hip hop tradition, in an attempt to make through remakes and cover, crossover hits in between various genres of music. The program broadcast on Eén Belgian Flemish station is an adaptation of a series of shows by Moroccan-Dutch artist Ali B on TROS entitled Ali B op volle toeren.

Discography

Albums

Singles

Featured in

References

1984 births
Living people
People from Torhout
21st-century Belgian male singers
21st-century Belgian singers